Kilkisiakos Football Club is a Greek football club, based in Kilkis, Greece.

History
Kilkisiakos is an athletic football club of Kilkis, founded in 1961 after the merger of the local AEK, Aris and Megas Alexandros Kilkis.

The 1964-1965 season promoted for the first in its history at the Second National Division remaining in category until 1967.
In 1969, they returned again in the same category as a contestant since 1975 and competed in the same category again from 1976 to 1980. 
Returns to the Football League in 1981 until 1983 and 1985 until 1987. 
They participate twice in the Greek Cup final of amateurs in 1998 and 2007.

Today plays again in Football League 2 after 9 seasons.

Honours

Domestic
 Third Division: 2
 1975–76, 1984–85
 Fourth Division: 2
 1991–92, 1997–98

External links
 Official website

Football clubs in Central Macedonia
Association football clubs established in 1961
1961 establishments in Greece